Al Hazm is a town in Makkah Province, in western Saudi Arabia. It lies near Turabah.

See also 

 List of cities and towns in Saudi Arabia
 Regions of Saudi Arabia

References

Populated places in Mecca Province